The Romance of Affliction is the second studio album by American hardcore punk band SeeYouSpaceCowboy. It was released on November 5, 2021, through Pure Noise Records. The album was produced by Knocked Loose guitarist Isaac Hale with additional production done by Matt Guglielmo.

Musical style
The album's musical style has been described as sasscore, metalcore, post-hardcore and emo. Additionally, the album also contains influences from mathcore and deathcore.

Background
On September 22, 2021, the band announced that they would be releasing a new album later that year called The Romance of Affliction. On the same day, the band released the album's first single, "Misinterpreting Constellations." On October 6, the band released the single "Intersecting Storylines to the Same Tragedy," featuring vocals from Underoath drummer and vocalist Aaron Gillespie. The album's third and final single, "The End to a Brief Moment of Lasting Intimacy," was released on October 20.

Track listing

Personnel
SeeYouSpaceCowboy
Connie Sgarbossa – vocals
Ethan Sgarbossa – guitar, vocals
Taylor Allen – bass, vocals
AJ Tartol – drums

Additional
Keith Buckley – additional vocals (track 1)
Shaolin G – additional vocals (track 4)
Aaron Gillespie – additional vocals (track 8)
If I Die First – additional vocals (track 13)
Isaac Hale – producer
Matt Guglielmo – engineer, additional production
Will Putney – mixing, mastering
Flesh and Bone Designs – layout, artwork

References

2021 albums
Pure Noise Records albums